Mohamed Lamine Traoré (born 13 October 1991) is a Guinean footballer who plays as a defender for ASD Piccardo Traversetolo.

Career

Parma
Born in Guinea, Traoré emigrated to the Emilia-Romagna region of Italy when he was around 10 years old; his younger brother Cherif became a professional rugby union player. He started his career at the reserve team of Parma; On 10 July 2010, he was signed by South Tyrol.

Foggia
In summer 2011 he was signed by Foggia in a co-ownership deal for €500. In June 2012 he returned to Parma for an undisclosed fee.

Crotone
On 26 July 2012, he was signed by F.C. Crotone in another co-ownership deal for €500.

Return to Parma
On 22 January 2013, he returned to Parma again for €500 in a -year contract.

Traoré was signed by Gubbio on 13 July 2013, along with Parma team-mate such as Baccolo, Caccavallo, Cacchioli, Ferrari, Luparini, Moroni, Sarr and Tartaglia. On 31 January 2014 Traoré returned to South Tyrol. South Tyrol also signed Riccardo Cocuzza from Parma via Gubbio as well as sent Andrea Molinelli to Gubbio.

Cesena
On 30 June 2014, the last day of 2013–14 financial year, Parma sold Cascione (€2.5M), Traoré (€1.5M) and Crialese (€1M) to Cesena, with Ravaglia (€2.5M), Lolli  (€1.5M) and Turchetta (€1M) moved to opposite direction. Traoré signed a three-year contract. On 27 July 2014, Traoré was signed by Santarcangelo.

Piccardo Traversetolo
In July 2019, Traoré joined ASD Piccardo Traversetolo.

References

External links

1991 births
Living people
People from Kindia
Guinean emigrants to Italy
Italian sportspeople of African descent
Sportspeople from the Province of Reggio Emilia
Guinean footballers
Italian footballers
Association football defenders
Guinea international footballers
Serie C players
Serie D players
Calcio Foggia 1920 players
F.C. Crotone players
A.S. Gubbio 1910 players
F.C. Südtirol players
A.C. Cesena players
Parma Calcio 1913 players
Santarcangelo Calcio players